Diether Kunerth (born 1940 in Freiwaldau) is a contemporary artist who lives in Ottobeuren, Upper Swabia.

Life
Diether Kunerth was born in 1940 in Freiwaldau in the Reichsgau Sudetenland. He studied from 1960 to 1967 at the Academy of Fine Arts, Munich and was master-class student of Prof. Kirchner. 
Kunerth soon turned his back on the city to work in Ottobeuren. Without being subject to the constraints of big-city art business, he developed a large and extensive oeuvre. In consideration of Kunerth's artistic significance, the municipality of Ottobeuren established the Museum für zeitgenössische Kunst – Diether Kunerth (museum for contemporary art – Diether Kunerth), which cost 4.7 Mio Euro and was co-funded by the federal state of Bavaria und the EU. The museum opened on May 24, 2014.

Exhibitions (selection)

Solo exhibitions
Galerie Gurlitt, München (1964,1967)
Landesmuseum Detmold (1977)
Dobler Hau, Kaufbeuren (1977)
Schaezler Palais, Augsburg (1978)
Galerie Lüpfert, Hannover (1978, 1986)
Städtische Galerie, Paderborn (1980, 1981)
Städtische Galerie, Stade (1981)
Galerie von Braunbehrens, München (1985)
Galerie Neuendorf, Memmingen (1986–2004)
Brechthaus, Augsburg (1986)
Galerie in der Finkenstraße, München (1987)
Städtische Galerie, Bielefeld (1987)
Universität, Bielefeld (1989)
made Galerie, Thannhausen (1990)
Galerie Tabula, Tübingen (1990)
Städtische Galerie, Leutkirch (1990)
EP-Galerie, Düsseldorf (1991, 1995–1997)
Kreuzherrnsaal, Memmingen (1992)
Haus des Gastes, Bad Grönenbach (1993, 1997)
Kornhaus, Kirchheim/Teck (1994)
Paris-Haus, Memmingen (1994)
Theaterfoyer, Memmingen (1995)
Johanniterhalle, Schwäbisch Hall (1997)
Schloß Elbroich, Düsseldorf (1996)
Art Cabinet, Nantucket, USA (1996, 1998)
Toskanische Säulenhalle, Augsburg (1997)
Marktplatz Ottobeuren (2002)
St. Ulrich Basilika, Augsburg (2003)
Basilika Ottobeuren (2003)
Stadttheater Memmingen (2003)
Museum für zeitgenössische Kunst – Diether Kunerth, Ottobeuren (2014–2015)

Group exhibitions
Museo Würth, La Rioja
Museum Würth, Künzelau
Design Fair, New York
Galerie Neuendorf, Memmingen
Künstlerhaus Thurn und Taxis, Bregenz
Echnaton Galerie, Kairo, Ägypten
Galerie Yanagizawa, Tokio
Galerie Marquit, Boston, USA
Museo d'arte moderna e contemporanea Trento e Rovereto (MART), Arte Sella Documenta
Galleria d'Arte Moderna e Contemporanea (GAMeC) di Bergamo, Accademia Carrara
Art Miami, International Modern & Contemporary Art
Nevin Kelly Gallery, Washington DC
Design Fair, New York
Dunap Galerie, Budapest, Ungarn
Expo Hannover

Awards
1970: Kunstpreis des Regierungsbezirks Schwaben
1978: Kulturpreis der Stadt Memmingen
1985: Großer Sieben-Schwaben-Preis Augsburg
1988: Bürgerpreis der Stadt Kempten (Dachser Preis)
2000: Strigelpreis der Stadt Memmingen

Works
1996: world's largest wooden head, Erkheim

External links
Museum für zeitgenössische Kunst - Diether Kunerth | Museum für zeitgenössische Kunst – Diether Kunerth, 87724 Ottobeuren im Allgäu

References

German painters
German male painters
German sculptors
German male sculptors
Contemporary painters
1940 births
Living people
People from Jeseník